Taylor Groves Brown (1890–1957) was a member of the Wisconsin State Senate.

Biography
Brown was born on February 28, 1890, in Richland County, Wisconsin. He attended the University of Wisconsin-Platteville and the University of Wisconsin-Madison.

Career
Brown was a member of the Senate from the 19th district from 1939 to 1950. Previously, he was Mayor of Oshkosh, Wisconsin, from 1930 to 1933. He was a Republican.

Brown died July 18, 1957, in Oshkosh, Wisconsin, where he is buried at the Lake View Memorial Park.

References

1890 births
1957 deaths
People from Richland County, Wisconsin
Politicians from Oshkosh, Wisconsin
Republican Party Wisconsin state senators
Mayors of places in Wisconsin
University of Wisconsin–Platteville alumni
University of Wisconsin–Madison alumni
20th-century American politicians